was a feudal domain under the Tokugawa shogunate of Edo period Japan, located in Ise Province in what is part of now modern-day Kameyama, Mie. It was centered around Ise-Kameyama Castle. Ise-Kameyama Domain was controlled by fudai daimyō clans throughout most its history.

History
The Ise-Kamayama area of northern Ise Province was controlled in the Sengoku period by Seki Morinobu. Under Toyotomi Hideyoshi, his son Seki Kazumasa was relocated to Mino Province and replaced by Hideyoshi's general Okamoto Yoshikatsu as part of a 22,000 koku fief. Okamoto Yoshikatsu rebuilt Kameyama Castle and laid out the foundations for the castle town. However, he sided with the pro-Toyotomi Western Army at the 1600 Battle of Sekigahara and was dispossessed by the victorious Tokugawa Ieyasu, who restored Seki Kazumasa to his former domains with an increase in kokudaka to 30,000 koku. Under Seki Kazumasa, Kameyama-juku, the post station on the  Tōkaidō was repaired and expanded. He was transferred to Kurosaka Domain in Hōki Province in 1611.The domain was assigned to Matsudaira Tadaaki from the Okudaira-branch of the Matsudaira clan until 1615, when he was transferred to Settsu Province in the wake of the Siege of Osaka and final downfall of the Toyotomi clan. Ise-Kameyama Domain briefly reverted to tenryō status and was administered by a daikan sent from Tsu Domain.

The domain was revived in 1620, when Miyake Yasunobu was transferred from Koromo Domain. Kameyama would continue to be ruled by a rapid succession of fudai daimyō clans until the Meiji restoration. In 1636, the Miyake were replaced by a cadet branch of the Honda clan, who were in turn replaced by the Ishikawa clan in 1651, the Itakura clan in 1669, and the  Ogyū-Matsudaira in 1710. The Itakura clan returned in 1717, only to be replaced by the Ishikawa clan again in 1744. The Ishikawa would continue to rule Kameyama until the end of the Tokugawa shogunate, bringing some measure of political stability. However, the domain suffered financially from repeated natural disasters and crop failures. Efforts at reform by the fourth daimyō, Ishikawa Fusahiro, were met with widespread opposition leading to large-scale peasant's uprisings in 1768. Efforts made by his successors to introduce tea cultivation and sericulture were more successful. During the Boshin War, s with many domains, the samurai of the domain were divided between a pro-sonnō jōi faction who favored a restoration of political power to the Emperor of Japan and a stronger foreign policy, and a pro-status quo faction still loyal to the Tokugawa shogunate. IHowever, due to early military victories by the imperial side, the domain, together with neighboring Toba Domain pledged fealty to the new Meiji government and sent troops to fight against the pro-Tokugawa remnants in eastern and northern Japan. As with all domains, Ise-Kamayema Domain was abolished in the 1871 abolition of the han system.

Holdings at the end of the Edo period
As with most domains in the han system, Ise-Kameyama Domain consisted of several discontinuous territories calculated to provide the assigned kokudaka, based on periodic cadastral surveys and projected agricultural yields. 

Ise Province 
5 villages in Mie District
5 villages in Kawawa District
74 villages in Suzuka District
Bitchū Province
3 villages in Aga District
3 villages in Jōbō District

List of daimyō

See also 
 List of Han
 Abolition of the han system

References

Domains of Japan
1601 establishments in Japan
1871 disestablishments in Japan
Ise Province
History of Mie Prefecture
Suzuka, Mie